Annaphila is a genus of moths of the family Noctuidae. The genus was erected by Augustus Radcliffe Grote in 1873.

Species
 Annaphila abdita Rindge & Smith, 1952
 Annaphila arvalis H. Edwards, 1875
 Annaphila astrologa Barnes & McDunnough, 1918
 Annaphila baueri Rindge & Smith, 1952
 Annaphila casta H. Edwards, 1890
 Annaphila danistica Grote, 1873
 Annaphila decia Grote, 1875
 Annaphila depicta Grote, 1873
 Annaphila diva Grote, 1873
 Annaphila divinula Grote, 1878
 Annaphila evansi Rindge & Smith, 1952
 Annaphila hennei Rindge & Smith, 1952
 Annaphila ida Rindge & Smith, 1952
 Annaphila lithosina H. Edwards, 1875
 Annaphila macfarlandi Buckett & Bauer, 1964
 Annaphila mera Harvey, 1875
 Annaphila miona Smith, 1908
 Annaphila olgae Sala, [1964]
 Annaphila pseudoastrologa Sala, [1964]
 Annaphila pustulata H. Edwards, 1881
 Annaphila scurlockorum Sala & Mustelin, 2006
 Annaphila spila Rindge & Smith, 1952
 Annaphila superba H. Edwards, 1875
 Annaphila vivianae Sala, [1964]

References

Acronictinae
Noctuoidea genera